Marouane Hadhoudi (Arabic: مروان الهدهودي; born 13 February 1992) is a Moroccan professional footballer who plays as a centre-back for Botola club Raja Club Athletic and the Moroccan national team.

Early life
Marouane Hadhoudi was born on 13 February 1992 in the district of Derb Sultan, Casablanca. Being a fan of Raja Club Athletic from an early age, he used to go to Stade Mohammed V to support his favorite team. He joined the club's academy in 2003.

Club career

Debut
On 29 April 2012, his made his senior debut against JS Massira on the end of the 2011-12 season (victory 1-4). Next season, he joined Racing AC on a 1-year loan. He left Raja CA in 2013 to join Chabab Rif Al Hoceima. He played the 2014-15 season for RS Berkane.

Difaâ El Jadida
On August 18 2015, Difaâ Hassani El Jadidi rolled up Marouane Hadhoudi for three seasons.
On September 13, he made his debut against RS Berkane replacing Jawad El Omari at the end of the game. He started the next match against Wydad AC (2-1 defeat).

On September 9 2016, he scored his first professional goal against Amal Souk Sabt in the first round of the 2016 Throne Cup (victory 3 -0). The Doukkali club will continue its course before being eliminated in the semi-finals against Olympique Club de Safi.
On December 4, Marouane Hadhoudi renewed his contract until the end of the 2019-20 season.

Difaâ will finish the championship in second position to secure a place in the Champions League for the second time in its history.
On February 21, 2018, Hadhoudi played his first match in African competitions against Sport Bissau e Benfica in the preliminary round of the 2018 CAF Champions League (draw 0-0). On September 2, 2019, he delivered his first assist against the Olympique de Khouribga on week 17 of the League (defeat 2-1).
On February 22, 2020, he scored his first goal in the Botola against Ittihad Tanger following a cross from Jonathan Ifunga Ifasso (draw 1-1).

Raja Club Athletic
On September 9, 2020, Raja announced the arrival of Marouane Hadhoudi who signed a 3-year contract. The player is a product of the club's academy before he left in 2013.
On December 10 at Stade Mohammed V, he played his first game with Raja CA since his return against Rapide Oued Zem (victory 3-2).

In July 2021, he achieved the 2021 CAF Confederation Cup after defeating JS Kabylie 2–1 in the final. Raja lost the 2021 CAF Super Cup against Al Ahly SC in penalties.

International career
In January 2018, he was selected by Jamal Sellami to participate in the 2018 African Nations Championship scheduled in Morocco . The Atlas Lions will achieve a faultless course and will win the title by beating the Nigeria in the final (4-0).

Honours

Raja CA
Arab Champions League: 2020
CAF Confederation Cup: 2021
Botola runner-up: 2020-21, 2021-22
CAF Super Cup runner-up: 2021

Difaâ El Jadida
Botola runner-up: 2016-17
Coupe du Trône runner-up: 2017

Morocco
African Nations Championship: 2018

References

1992 births
Living people
People from Casablanca
Moroccan footballers
Association football defenders
Raja CA players
RS Berkane players
Difaâ Hassani El Jadidi players
Racing de Casablanca players
Chabab Rif Al Hoceima players